Giulio Donnini (born 17 February 1924) is an Italian film actor.

Life and career 
Born in Milan, Donnini made his film debut in 1946, in Giacomo Gentilomo's Teheran. He got his first mayor role two years later, playing the epileptic murderer Smerdjakov in Gentilomo's The Brothers Karamazov. From then Donnini specialized in playing negative and often violent characters, being mainly cast in supporting roles. He was also very active on stage.

Selected filmography 
 The Brothers Karamazov (1947)
 Love and Poison (1950)
 The Transporter (1950)
 O.K. Nerone (1951)
 Tragic Spell (1951)
 The Rival of the Empress (1951)
 The Adventures of Mandrin (1952)
 Shadows Over Trieste (1952)
 It's Never Too Late (1953)
 Beat the Devil (1953) as Administrator
 Frine, Courtesan of Orient (1953)
 Barrier of the Law (1954)
 Disowned (1954)
 Vendicata! (1955)
 The Dragon's Blood (1957)
 Slave Women of Corinth (1958)
 Dubrowsky (1959)
 Messalina (1960)
 The Conqueror of the Orient (1960)
 Robin Hood and the Pirates (1960)  
 Caesar the Conqueror (1962)
 Venus Against the Son of Hercules (1962)
 Hercules Against the Sons of the Sun (1964)  
 Samson vs. the Giant King (1964)
 Terror of the Steppes (1964)
 The Almost Perfect Crime (1966)  
 El Greco  (1966) 
 L'Odissea (1968)
 La morte ha fatto l'uovo (1968)
 La minorenne (1974)
 Le comiche 2 (1991)

References

External links 
 

1924 births
Italian male film actors
Italian male stage actors
Male actors from Milan
20th-century Italian male actors
Possibly living people